The 2011 LSU Tigers baseball team represented Louisiana State University in the NCAA Division I baseball season of 2011. The Tigers played their home games in the new Alex Box Stadium, which opened in 2009.

The team was coached by Paul Mainieri who was in his fifth season at LSU. In the previous season, the Tigers failed to defend their 2009 National Title; however, the Tigers were able to successfully repeat as SEC Tournament Champions. Overall, the Tigers finished 41–22, 14–16 in the SEC.

Pre-season

Key Losses
Anthony Ranaudo, P Drafted in Comp. A, 39th overall, of the 2010 MLB Draft by the Boston Red Sox
Micah Gibbs, C Drafted in Round 3, 97th overall, of the 2010 MLB Draft by the Chicago Cubs
Leon Landry, OF Drafted in Round 3, 109th overall, of the 2010 MLB Draft by the Los Angeles Dodgers
Blake Dean, 1B Drafted in Round 8, 262nd overall, of the 2010 MLB Draft by the Los Angeles Dodgers

Personnel

2011 roster

2011 LSU Tigers Baseball Roster & Bios http://www.lsusports.net/SportSelect.dbml?SPSID=27867&SPID=2173&Q_SEASON=2010

Coaching Staff

2011 LSU Tigers Baseball Coaches & Bios http://www.lsusports.net/SportSelect.dbml?&DB_OEM_ID=5200&SPID=2173&SPSID=28707

Schedule/Results

*Rankings are based on the team's current  ranking in the Baseball America poll the week LSU faced each opponent.

LSU Tigers in the 2011 Major League Baseball Draft
The following members and future members (denoted by *) of the LSU Tigers baseball program were drafted in the 2011 MLB Draft.

References

LSU Tigers baseball seasons
Lsu Tigers Baseball Team, 2011
LSU